Copper(II) perchlorate is a salt of copper and perchloric acid. It is a hygroscopic crystalline blue solid, most commonly copper(II) perchlorate hexahydrate, Cu(ClO4)2·6H2O. Like any perchlorate, it is a strong oxidizing agent.

References

Copper(II) compounds
Perchlorates